WAD, Wad, or wad may refer to:

People 
 Joan the Wad, a mythological character in Cornish folklore
 Nishigandha Wad (born 1969), Indian film actress
 William Addison Dwiggins (1880–1956), American type and graphic designer known by his initials

Science and technology 
 Doom WAD, the default format of package files for the id Tech 1 game engine. Stands for "Where's All the Data?"
 Wad, any black manganese oxide or hydroxide mineral rich rock of various ore deposits
 WAD, the IATA airport code for Andriamena Airport, Andriamena, Madagascar
 Wadding, disc of material used in guns 
 Wii WAD, a file archive which can be used on a Wii gaming console via homebrew software
 Web Accessibility Directive, EU law that ensures that all public sector organizations are accessible for persons with disabilities.

Other uses 
 wad, the Dutch term for a mud flat on the Wadden Sea
Wretched and Divine: The Story of the Wild Ones, a 2013 album by American rock band Black Veil Brides

See also 
 Wadh, a town in Balochistan